HaZor'im is a religious moshav in northern Israel. Located three kilometres south-west of Tiberias, it falls under the jurisdiction of Lower Galilee Regional Council.

History
The village was established on 23 May 1939 in the Tower and Stockade settlement method, by Jewish immigrants from Europe, mostly from Germany and the Netherlands, joined after a while by immigrants from North Africa. The founders belonged to the Union of Religious Pioneers, the Ezra youth movement and the Mizrahi Youth.

References

Dutch-Jewish culture in Israel
German-Jewish culture in Israel
North African-Jewish culture in Israel
Moshavim
Religious Israeli communities
Populated places in Northern District (Israel)
Populated places established in 1939
1939 establishments in Mandatory Palestine